The First O'Shanassy Ministry was the 2nd ministry of the Government of Victoria. It was led by the Premier of Victoria, John O’Shanassy, with the swearing in of the ministry occurring on 11 March 1857.

* Chapman was not a member of Parliament at this time.

References 

O'Shanassy
Ministries of Queen Victoria